Kiens is a comune (municipality) in South Tyrol in northern Italy, located about  northeast of Bolzano.

Geography

Kiens borders the following municipalities: Pfalzen, Rodeneck, St. Lorenzen, Mühlwald, Terenten and Vintl.

Frazioni
The municipality of Kiens contains the frazioni (subdivisions, mainly villages and hamlets) Ehrenburg (Casteldarne), Getzenberg (Monghezzo), Hofern (Corti) and St. Sigmund (San Sigismondo).

History
The hamlet appears for the first time in the Freising book of traditions (Traditionsbuch) in a deed issued in the years 1005—39 as ″locus Kiehna″.

Coat-of-arms
The emblem is based on that of the family Schöneck; on gules a curved pile argent. In the right corner take place a five-pointed argent star, symbolizing the five villages in the municipality. The emblem was adopted in 1961.

Society

Linguistic distribution
According to the 2011 census, 96.73% of the population speak German, 2.32% Italian and 0.95% Ladin as first language.

Demographic evolution

Demographic evolution

St. Sigmund 

St. Sigmund is a frazione of Kiens, its origins date back to 1050, when first it was called Burin and after Peuren, in 1317.

The town is located where the valley widens into a large flat area, for that reason it enjoys excellent weather conditions throughout the year.

From an architectural point of view, the buildings in the area are based on original South Tyrolean farmsteads style. Especially is notable the parish church (1449–89), where is present the oldest and best preserved altar in Tyrol, dated around 1430. Another point of interest is the Church of Our Lady dating back to 1621 and built in Baroque style. Behind the railway station, in the river Rienz, there are the Ilistra thermal baths (German: Ilstern), which once featured facilities for cures. Also in this area is the church of St. Ulrich that dates back to 1491 and is well preserved.

References

External links 
 Official website of the municipality (in German and Italian)
 Official website of the frazione of St. Sigmund.

Municipalities of South Tyrol